Mallıca can refer to the following villages in Turkey:

 Mallıca, Bayat
 Mallıca, İvrindi